Addi Welo may refer to:

Places

Ethiopia
 Addi Welo, a village in the Degol Woyane municipality
 Addi Welo, a village in the Mizane Birhan municipality

See also 
 Welo or Wollo Province, an ancient administrative unit
 North Wollo Zone, current administrative unit
 North Wollo Zone, current administrative unit